Olive Hill is a township located in Person County, North Carolina, United States. It has a population of approximately 2,840 people.  Olive Hill is home to a public park and a private community pool.

References 

Unincorporated communities in Person County, North Carolina
Unincorporated communities in North Carolina